Simon Wolf Oppenheimer (died 10 November 1726) was a German Jewish banker and Court Jew of the Electorate of Brunswick-Lüneburg in Hanover. He was the son of Samuel Oppenheimer, and was married to Frade Behrends, the granddaughter of Leffmann Behrends.

The astronomer Raphael Levi Hannover was a bookkeeper in his firm. His son Jacob Wolf Oppenheimer took over his banking business after his death in 1726, and later employed Mayer Amschel Rothschild as an apprentice between 1757 and 1763.

References 

17th-century births
1726 deaths
German bankers
17th-century German Jews
Court Jews
18th-century German businesspeople